Angie or Angela Miller may refer to:

 Angie Miller (American singer) (born 1994), American singer-songwriter and American Idol contestant
 Angie Miller (British singer), active in the 1970s
 Angela Miller (volleyball), American volleyball player
 Angela Miller, a character in Resident Evil: Degeneration